Serhiy Syzyi (born 1 September 1995 in Kharkiv, Ukraine) is a professional Ukrainian football midfielder who plays for Sanjoanense.

Career
Syzyi is a product of the FC Arsenal Kharkiv and UFK Kharkiv School Systems.

He made his debut for FC Metalist in the match against FC Dynamo Kyiv on 1 March 2015 in the Ukrainian Premier League.

References

External links
 

1995 births
Living people
Ukrainian footballers
Footballers from Kharkiv
FC Metalist Kharkiv players
Ukrainian Premier League players
Ukrainian expatriate footballers
Expatriate footballers in Portugal
C.D. Aves players
Liga Portugal 2 players
AD Fafe players
Ukrainian expatriate sportspeople in Portugal
Association football midfielders